Herbert Gordon (1952 – 17 November 2013) was a Jamaican footballer who primarily played as a forward for Boys' Town. He played for the Jamaica national team, his appearances including World Cup qualifiers in 1976.

Herbert Gordon died on 17 November 2013, aged 61, in Kingston.

References

1952 births
2013 deaths
Sportspeople from Kingston, Jamaica
Jamaican footballers
Jamaica international footballers
Association football forwards
Boys' Town F.C. players